John Hartnett can refer to:

 John Hartnett (athlete) (born 1950), Irish athlete
 John Hartnett (hurler) (born 1960), Irish hurler
 John Hartnett (physicist) (born 1952), Australian cosmologist